Ambika class is a class of Replenishment Vessel currently in service with the Indian Navy. INS Ambika is the only ship in this class.

Ships of the class

See also
INS Purak
INS Puran
INS Poshak (Shalimar)

References
INS Ambika - Bharat Rakshak

Auxiliary ships of the Indian Navy
 
Auxiliary replenishment ship classes